The Sonneborn–Berger score (or the Neustadtl score) is a scoring system often used to break ties in chess tournaments. It is computed by summing the conventional score of each defeated opponent, and half the conventional score of each drawn opponent.

Neustadtl score is named after Hermann Neustadtl, who proposed it in a letter published in Chess Monthly in 1882. It is often called the Sonneborn–Berger score, though this is something of a misnomer, since William Sonneborn and Johann Berger were strong critics of the system; they proposed their own scoring system that added in the square of the raw score of each player, which would help if the system was used as the scoring system for some types of tournaments, but would not help with breaking ties between players with conventional scoring. As such, although theoretically equivalent to the current method, albeit more complicated, the Non-Neustadtl Sonneborn–Berger score has never been popular for tiebreaks.

More common tiebreaking methods in chess tournaments include the Neustadtl Sonneborn–Berger score, head-to-head score, Koya score, or favoring the player with the most wins (or black games). In Swiss system events, comparison of the Buchholz scores and the sum of progressive scores are common.

Neustadtl Sonneborn–Berger score
A player's Neustadtl Sonneborn–Berger score is calculated by adding the sum of the conventional scores of the players they have defeated to half the sum of the conventional scores of those they have drawn against.

The main point is to give more value for a win/draw against a player ranked high, than for a win/draw against a player ranked low in the tournament.

Since players may share the same Neustadtl score, further means of breaking ties may be required; common methods include considering the score in games played between the tied players or favouring the player with the most wins. Some tournaments do not use Neustadtl to break ties at all (Linares, for example, gives preference to the player with the most wins), and others use no tie-breaking method at all, sharing the prize money on offer between players. In national championships or events which act as qualifying tournaments for others, there may be a blitz playoff between the tied players. Neustadtl remains the most common tie-breaking method in round-robin tournaments, though in Swiss system events, comparison of the Buchholz scores and the sum of progressive scores is more common.

Example
As an example of the system in action, here is the crosstable of the 1975–80 World Correspondence Chess Championship Final:

Both Jørn Sloth and Vladimir Zagorovsky finished with 11 points from 14 games, but Sloth won the tournament because his Neustadtl score of 69.5 was higher than Zagovorsky's 66.75. Kosenkov had a higher Neustadl score (67.5) than Zagovorsky, but finished third due to their lower points total of 10.

Sloth's Neustadtl score was calculated by multiplying his results by the points total of each opponent, then summing them together:

Non-Neustadtl Sonneborn-Berger score
The Non-Neustadtl Sonneborn–Berger score is the scoring system proposed by William Sonneborn and Johann Berger as an improvement to the Neustadtl score, which was not originally designed for tie-breaking. The Non-Neustadtl Sonneborn–Berger score was invented by Oscar Gelbfuhs about 1873 to be used as a weighted score in round-robin tournaments. It would be used instead of the raw score for final places. In 1886, Sonneborn criticized the system and suggested an improvement that would give a better-weighted score. Sonneborn's suggestion was to add the square of the player's points to weighted score. In 1887 and 1888, Berger studied Gelbfuhs' system and the suggestion of Sonneborn. Berger agreed with Sonneborn's approach. This improvement became known as the Sonneborn-Berger system.

When the system is used to break ties between equally scoring players, adding in the square of the player's raw score has no impact on players that are tied (a raw score of one player tied with another is the same value), so improvement of Sonneborn and Berger has been omitted. However, the system has retained the Sonneborn-Berger name.

See also
 Tie-breaking in Swiss-system tournaments

References

External links
FIDE handbook
Tie-Breaks in Swiss Tournaments

Tie-breaking in group tournaments
Chess tournament systems